Pancracio Chocolates is an artisan chocolate brand. The firm originated in Cadiz, Spain, and was founded in 2003 by Pedro Alvarez, economic and graphic designer. In 2017 it was bought by a luxury sector Valencian firm.  The chocolates and sweets are made in Spain and are sold in renowned department stores and gourmet shops around the world.

Origin and development 
The brand developed from Alvarez’s love for chocolate and is characterized by careful presentation. This draws on the professional experience of its founder who is a graphic designer. He trained in the 1990s in New York at, among others, the School of Visual Arts. This period saw a boom in coffees outlets, like Starbucks, and Alvarez was inspired to start his own entrepreneurial project in sweets and chocolate.

After studying Catering and Pastry Making at the International Culinary Center of New York University, Alvarez returned to Europe where he continued his training as a chocolatier at  Sole Graells in Barcelona, Chocovic with Ramón Morató in Vic and Le Cordon Bleu in London. Determined to create his own brand, he found an artisan chocolatier  to create the chocolates that he had designed, and, in 2003, he created the first batch of nougats and chocolates, carefully presented and packaged,  and launched in Cádiz under the name Pancracio.

Subsequently, products were sold at Colette de Paris and shortly after at Bergdorf Goodman in New York, Neiman Marcus in the US, Selfridges in London and select stores in Spain. Eventually, a boutique was opened in Cádiz. The chocolates were also sold through a dedicated website, which enabled access to an international market alongside the very selective distribution.

The company’s chocolate and sweet products are unique, varied and unusual. They include, crunchy chocolates, truffles with armagnac, dark chocolate with hazelnuts, chocolate covered almonds, nougats, panettones, bars, sardines and chocolate corn, spreadable creams, fondue chocolate, and "cupcakes".  The company also produces teas, jams and a chocolate vodka. The recipes can be found in the book "Modern Chocolate" (2008) and in "Postmodern Chocolate" (2016).

Each Pancracio product has its own identity. They are presented in a white box with a clean design; a cotton ribbon and the product name.  The white background edged with black is sophisticated and minimalist, reminiscent of old cafes and patisseries. The packages were designed by Pedro Álvarez from Ideologo branding, together with Massimo Vignelli, from Vignelli Associates, Alexander Gelman from Design Machin, and Pati Núñez.

Awards and Recognitions

Pancracio Original Chocolate Vodka 

 "Best in Class 2008" in the International Wine & Spirit Competition.  
 Bronze in the White Spirits category in the International Spirits Challenge (2008)

Pancracio Store 

 2011 Grand Prix Gourmet Award by Marie Claire.

Packaging Pancracio 

 Communications Arts,  Design Magazine, 2006, nº 344.
 Design Annual, 2007, nº 47.

Chocolate Moderno Book 

 Gourmand World Cookbook Award 2008

Cook books 

 Chocolate Moderno(2008), by Pedro Álvarez and the Pancracio team. Edit El País Aguilar. 
 Chocolate Posmoderno (2016), by Pedro Álvarez and the Pancracio team, Ed. Grijalbo.

References

Related links 
 Marca España, the most exquisite chocolate is Spanish.
 Pancracio Website
Ideologo Branding

Spanish chocolate companies
Spanish companies established in 2003